Pachynemertes is a monotypic genus of nemerteans belonging to the family Pachynemertidae. The only species is Pachynemertes obesa.

References

Monotypic nemertea genera
Polystilifera
Nemertea genera